FK Sinđelić Beograd is a football club based in Voždovac, Belgrade, Serbia. They compete in the Serbian League Belgrade, the third tier of the national league system.

History
Founded in 1937, the club was named after the historical Serbian figure Stevan Sinđelić. They became part of a newly formed FD Drvodeljac in 1945. The club would merge with FD Građevinac to form FD Graditelj in 1946. They changed their name to Gvožđar in 1950 and finally to Sinđelić in the same year. The club competed exclusively in the lower tiers of Yugoslav football.

The club won first place in the Serbian League Belgrade at the end of the 2012–13 season and took promotion to the Serbian First League. They spent seven consecutive seasons in the second tier, before withdrawing from the league for financial reasons.

Honours
Serbian League Belgrade (Tier 3)
Champions (1): 2012–13

Seasons

Notable players
This is a list of players who have played at full international level.
  Dejan Damjanović
  Aleksandar Paločević
  Dušan Petronijević
  Lazar Tufegdžić
  Slobodan Marković
  Nenad Mladenović
  Jovan Aćimović
  Jusuf Hatunić
  Stanislav Karasi
  Blagoje Paunović
For a list of all FK Sinđelić Beograd players with a Wikipedia article, see :Category:FK Sinđelić Beograd players.

Managerial history

References

External links
 

 Club page at Srbijasport

1937 establishments in Serbia
Association football clubs established in 1937
Football clubs in Belgrade
Football clubs in Serbia